Peter J. McWhinney (born 25 July 1956) is an Australian professional golfer.

Professional career 
McWhinney played in the 1983 Queensland PGA Championship. During the second round he shot a 67 (−5) to equal the course record. He was at 143 (−1), in a tie for second with Mike Ferguson, one back of Ossie Moore. After a third round 70 (−2), he took the 54-hole lead by three shots. He won the tournament.

McWhinney took the second round lead at the 1995 Australian Open.

McWhinney played on the Japan Golf Tour from 1993 to 1999, winning once.

Professional wins (2)

Japan Golf Tour wins (1)

PGA Tour of Australasia wins (1)

Results in major championships

CUT = missed the halfway cut
Note: McWhinney only played in The Open Championship.

References

External links

Australian male golfers
Japan Golf Tour golfers
1956 births
Living people